Everett Mall is a  indoor/outdoor shopping mall located in Everett, Washington, United States. Planned in the late 1960s, the mall began with the construction of two anchor stores, Sears in 1969 and White Front in 1971; the mall was originally built and opened in 1974. It was plagued from the start of development: construction was stalled in 1972 due to the Boeing bust, and it suffered further misfortune with one anchor store closing before the rest of the mall could open. The mall also had a low tenant rate upon opening, only rebounding after The Bon Marché (later Macy's) opened in 1977; the success led to the construction of an additional north wing to the mall anchored by the upscale Frederick & Nelson department store. In 2004, the mall underwent a massive expansion and renovation that included the addition of a 16-screen movie theater and outdoor stores along the south side. The mall's anchor stores are Regal Cinemas, LA Fitness, Burlington, Floor & Decor, Ulta Beauty, and Party City. There is one vacant anchor store that was once Sears.

Mervyn's, an anchor since 1992, closed late 2006. The store was replaced with LA Fitness and Steve & Barry's. Steve & Barry's in turn was closed in 2009 after its owners filed for Chapter 11 bankruptcy protection and was replaced by Burlington Coat Factory in 2013. Macy's closed its store in 2017 followed by Sears in early 2020.

Description
Everett Mall is located in the Twin Creeks neighborhood in southern Everett. It stands along Everett Mall Way, part of State Route 99 (SR 99), in a  space bounded by West Mall Drive to the west, 100th Street Southeast to the south, and Interstate 5 (I-5) to the east. It also acts as a transit hub for Everett Transit, serving several local bus routes.

History

Development and early construction: 1968–1972
The plan for a modern shopping mall in Everett was first formulated in the mid-1960s under the moniker "Broadway Mall". In 1968, developers Norman L. Iverson & Associates of Tacoma and Earl Cohen & Associates of Beverly Hills purchased a  lot south of downtown in the diagonal area bound by Interstate 5, US 99, and an earlier alignment of 99 known as the Broadway cutoff, now known as Everett Mall Way.  of the property nearest to the interstate would be the focus of future mall development. The first merchant they attracted to the new site was the Sears, Roebuck and Company department store, who would leave their location of 40 years at 2701 Colby Street in downtown Everett to build the first store on the property. Robert Freidenrich, soon-to-be manager of the new store, discussed the rationale of the store's exodus to the suburbs with The Seattle Times:
 

The store, which opened to the public on February 12, 1969, contained  arranged into 50 different departments. The store also contained a 14-stall automotive repair center, an outdoor garden center, a tailor shop and a 40-seat coffee shop. The Richardson Associates were the architects and engineers.

Sears was joined by another large anchor store on the property with the grand opening of the California-based discount department store chain, White Front on May 13, 1971. It was the chain's fifth store in the Puget Sound region. The Iverson and Cohen firms soon began planning for the construction of an enclosed mall to connect Sears and White Front as well as a planned third anchor store but construction was halted when massive cutbacks at Boeing threatened the economic stability of the entire region. Hackensack, New Jersey based developer, Hanson Development Company purchased the unfinished mall in July 1972 with promises to complete the project.

New construction and further setbacks: 1973–1977

The Law Company of Wichita, Kansas handled construction of the mall from its own architectural plans. Local firms Wick Construction Co. and Douglas Mulvanny, Seattle architect, were in charge of the construction and design of tenant spaces. 

In late 1973 came the announcement of a new triplex theater at the mall by General Cinema Corporation of Boston, who operated theaters in Renton and the Overlake area of Redmond. It was billed as Washington's first triple-auditorium indoor theater. The Everett Mall Cinemas I, II and III opened on February 13, 1974, with a seating capacity of 1,300. The opening attractions were The Sting, Serpico and American Graffiti.

Things began to fall apart for the developers when, in 1974, White Front declared bankruptcy and shuttered its large store at the mall, the last one in the state to close. Investors soon became wary of opening stores at the mall. After much delay, the Everett Mall finally opened in October 1974 with only one anchor tenant and little more than half of its stores occupied. The mall resembled a ghost town and was not actively promoted by its owners. The atmosphere of the mall at the time was described by The Seattle Times in 1977:

Turnaround and expansion: 1977–1992
Fortunes began to turn around when The Bon Marché purchased the former White Front store in 1976 with plans of moving their store from downtown Everett. An opening was set for February 25, 1977. Soon after the Bon's announcement, new retailers began to move to the mall. At the same time, Roebling Management Company, who managed the mall as a subsidiary of the Hanson group (later known as the Titanic Associates) announced plans to carry out the originally intended plans for the mall, including the third anchor store. In August 1977, construction began on the second triplex theater at the mall just west of Sears, to be operated but not owned by General Cinema. At that time the theater was a stand-alone building.

Construction of the mall's new $20 million east wing began in the fall of 1979 and was completed by the fall of 1980. The new addition officially opened on August 1, 1980, fully leased. The centerpiece of the expanded mall was the two-story,  Frederick & Nelson department store, the Marshall Field subsidiary's 15th store, designed by Beverly Hills architects Martinez, Takeda & Hahn. The mall's tenant mix remained stable until 1991, when Frederick & Nelson declared bankruptcy and subsequently closed its Everett store on September 22; it sold the lease to California-based Mervyn's, which then had a store at a strip mall along Evergreen Way in South Everett. Remodeling commenced in December once legal issues surrounding the bankruptcy were settled, with that store opening to much fanfare on July 19, 1992.

Financial troubles and new owners: 1998–2002
In 1998, Everett Mall's management, Hampshire Management Co., submitted plans to the City of Everett for a major expansion that, if carried out, would rival Alderwood Mall in size. Under the plan,  of retail space would be added as well as a new multiplex theater, a hotel and multiple restaurants. These plans soon became jeopardized when a financial crises hit the owners.

During the fall of 2000, the Everett Mall was placed into receivership by the Snohomish County Superior Court after finding that its owners, Titanic Associates of Morristown, New Jersey had defaulted on a loan. By 2001, Titanic had amassed $61 million of debt and were facing foreclosure of the property. To eliminate the debt, they deeded the mall to the Equitable Life Assurance Society of New York, who assumed operations. By the end of the year, Equitable hired Madison Marquette to manage the mall and direct its expansion.

Village expansion and decline: 2003–present
In 2003, expansion plans resumed. Construction began in 2004. In June 2004, Equitable sold Everett Mall for $50.2 million to Steadfast Commercial Properties of Newport Beach, California, who proceeded to replace Madison Marquette with their own management company to carry out the expansion.

The expansion project known as Everett Village broke ground in November 2004 with Best Buy, PetSmart, Old Navy, Borders Books and Bed Bath & Beyond announced as future tenants. Borders and Old Navy would occupy spaces within the mall's north wings rather than at the Village. Once completed in 2007, Steadfast sold the Village for $21.7 million to SJ Realty Investments of Ohio. SJ Realty sold the Village for $22.5 million in 2015 to San Francisco-based Stockbridge Capital Group, which then sold it to another California-based company, Argonaut Investments, for $24.85 million in 2018.

With the expansion, Regal Cinemas also committed to building a 16-screen cinema. Regal had taken over the triplex theater at the mall after AMC Theatres backed out of the mall's theater operations in January 2003 with the end of their lease approaching, abandoning the standalone seven-screen theater in the process; AMC had assumed operations via its acquisition of General Cinema in early 2002. The  theater officially opened to the public on July 14, 2006, replacing the triplex theater as well as a nine-screen theater two blocks west of the mall; the latter had opened on April 23, 1993, under the ownership of Act III Cinemas and was taken over by Regal when it acquired the company in 1998.

In late 2006, Mervyn's announced that it would shutter all of its Oregon and Washington locations; it later declared bankruptcy and underwent liquidation in 2008 during the Great Recession. The Everett store was divided between LA Fitness and national discount family clothing chain Steve & Barry's, with the latter taking up the entire second floor as well as half of the first floor with the portion facing the mall. Steve & Barry's opened in June 2007, but it also declared bankruptcy and closed all locations just over a year later; its space remained vacant until Burlington Coat Factory took over, opening on September 20, 2013. Borders underwent liquidation in 2011, with its space subsequently taken over by a local bookstore. Steadfast defaulted in 2012 on a 10-year, $98 million loan for the mall which it took from the Royal Bank of Canada in 2007. Steadfast avoided foreclosure on the mall, having Canyon Partners, a Los Angeles-based investment group, join ownership over it the following year. The Canyon Partners investment allowed the mall to attract Burlington Coat Factory as well as Party City and Ulta Beauty.

Macy's closed its store at the Everett Mall in 2017 and was replaced by Floor & Decor the following year. In October 2017, Brixton Capital, an affiliate of Brutten Global, purchased the property for an undisclosed price from Steadfast Companies and Canyon Partners, with JLL taking over the mall's management and leasing; the sale did not include the then-former Macy's space nor the Village. On August 31, 2019, it was announced that Sears would be closing their Everett location in December 2019. The Village did not fare any better; Bed Bath & Beyond followed suit after Sears, announcing on September 18, 2020, that they would close their store in Everett at the end of the year.

A major redevelopment of the original mall was announced by Brixton Capital in August 2022, proposing demolition of the central portion and food court. An outdoor parking area would be added in their place, along with new shops that would result in a 20 percent reduction in overall space. The Sears store is also planned to be demolished and replaced with an At Home store.

References

External links
Official website

Shopping malls in Snohomish County, Washington
Shopping malls established in 1971
Buildings and structures in Everett, Washington
Tourist attractions in Everett, Washington